Gjerdåker Station is a railway station on the Bergen Line.  It is located at Gjerdåker on the eastern edge of the village of Vossevangen in Voss municipality, Vestland county, Norway. The station is served by the Bergen Commuter Rail, operated by Vy Tog, with up to five daily departures in each direction. The station was opened in 1941.

External links
 Jernbaneverket's page on Gjerdåker

Railway stations in Voss
Railway stations on Bergensbanen
Railway stations opened in 1941